Andre Mannaart (born November 2, 1960, in Krommenie) is a Dutch former kickboxer and mixed martial artist. He was four times world champion in kickboxing and Muay Thai, having fought against K-1 legends such as Ernesto Hoost, Branko Cikatić, Maurice Smith and Ray Sefo. He is now a trainer at the Mejiro Gym in Amsterdam, where he has coached fighters of the calibre of Peter Aerts and Remy Bonjasky.

On June 26, 2010, Mannaart returned to kickboxing at Fight 058 in Leeuwarden, Netherlands, where he faced old foe Jan Lomulder. After five hard rounds, Mannaart lost by decision to Jan Lomulder.

Career titles
Sources:
1999 ISKA Low Kick World Champion
W.P.K.L. World Champion
WKA World Champion
WAKO World Champion
WKA European Cruiserweight Champion
WKA Intercontinental Super Heavyweight Champion

Kickboxing record

|-
|-  bgcolor="#FFBBBB"
| 2010-06-26 || Loss ||align=left| Jan Lomulder || Fight 058 || Leeuwarden, Netherlands || Decision || 5 || 3:00
|-
|-  bgcolor="#CCFFCC"
| 1999-02-03 || Win ||align=left| Mitsuya Nagai || K-1 Rising Sun '99 || Tokyo, Japan || KO (Right Punch) || 2 || 1:20
|-
|-  bgcolor="#CCFFCC"
| 1998-12-03 || Win ||align=left| Samir Benazzouz || Night of the Superstars || Amsterdam, Netherlands || Decision || 5 || 3:00
|-
|-  bgcolor="#CCFFCC"
| 1998-11-14 || Win ||align=left| Marc de Wit || Muay Thai Champions League - Part III || Amsterdam, Netherlands || Decision || 5 || 3:00
|-
|-  bgcolor="#FFBBBB"
| 1997-12-? || Loss ||align=left| Franz Haller || || Bolzano, Italy || Decision || 5 || 3:00
|-
! style=background:white colspan=9 |
|-
|-  bgcolor="#CCFFCC"
| 1997-04-? || Win ||align=left| Franz Haller || || Milan, Italy || KO || 3 || 
|-
|-  bgcolor="#CCFFCC"
| 1996-04-27 || Win ||align=left| Luc Verheye ||  || Amsterdam, Netherlands || Decision || 5 || 3:00
|-
|-  bgcolor="#FFBBBB"
| 1996-04-27 || Loss ||align=left| Lee Hasdell || World Oktagon Shoot Boxing Challenge '96, Final || Milan, Italy || Decision || 5 || 3:00
|-
! style=background:white colspan=9 |
|-
|-  bgcolor="#CCFFCC"
| 1996-04-27 || Win ||align=left| Adel Ferreira || World Oktagon Shoot Boxing Challenge '96, Semi Finals || Milan, Italy || KO (Liver Shot) || 1 ||
|-
|-  bgcolor="#FFBBBB"
| 1996-02-25 || Loss ||align=left| Ray Sefo || NZ - AUS - HOL || Auckland, New Zealand || KO (Punches) || 4 ||
|-
! style=background:white colspan=9 |
|-
|-  bgcolor="#FFBBBB"
| 1995-04-02 || Loss ||align=left| Jan Lomulder || || Amsterdam, Netherlands || Decision || 5 || 3:00
|-
|-  bgcolor="#FFBBBB"
| 1994-11-12 || Loss ||align=left| Frank Lobman || The Night of the Sensation || Amsterdam, Netherlands || KO || 4 ||
|-
|-  bgcolor="#FFBBBB"
| 1994-04-30 || Loss ||align=left| Branko Cikatić || K-1 Grand Prix '94, Quarter Finals || Tokyo, Japan || KO (Right Hook) || 2 ||
|-
|-  bgcolor="#CCFFCC"
| 1994-03-04 || Win ||align=left| Toshiyuki Atokawa || K-1 Challenge || Tokyo, Japan || Decision (Unanimous) || 5 || 3:00
|-
! style=background:white colspan=9 |
|-
|-  bgcolor="#CCFFCC"
| 1992 || Win ||align=left| Kosta Padoulitis ||  || Karlsruhe, Germany || TKO || 4 || 1:54
|-
! style=background:white colspan=9 |
|-
|-  bgcolor="#FFBBBB"
| 1991-06-29 || Loss ||align=left| Maurice Smith || Thriller from Paris I || Paris, France || KO || 2 ||
|-
|-  bgcolor="#FFBBBB"
| 1991-03-23 || Loss ||align=left| Branko Cikatić || World Kickboxing Association || Wiesbaden, Germany || Decision (Unanimous)|| 12 ||
|-
|-  bgcolor="#FFBBBB"
| 1990-07-? || Loss ||align=left| Jan Wessels || Holland vs Thailand || Amsterdam, Netherlands || KO || 7 ||
|-
! style=background:white colspan=9 |
|-
|-  bgcolor="#CCFFCC"
| 1989-11-19 || Win ||align=left| Mario Monaco || Kaman vs Wessels, Jaap Edenhal || Amsterdam, Netherlands || KO || 2 ||
|-
! style=background:white colspan=9 |
|-
|-  bgcolor="#CCFFCC"
| 1989 || Win ||align=left| Peter Aerts ||  || Netherlands || KO ||  ||
|-
|-  bgcolor="#FFBBBB"
| 1989-01-29 || Loss ||align=left| Peter Smit || A.J.K.F  || Tokyo, Japan || Decision || 5 || 3:00
|-
|-  bgcolor="#CCFFCC"
| 1988-11-20 || Win ||align=left| Ronnie Wagenmaker ||  || Netherlands || TKO || 5 ||
|-
|-  bgcolor="#FFBBBB"
| 1988-02-27 || Loss ||align=left| Ernesto Hoost || Superfights I || Amsterdam, Netherlands || KO || 3 ||
|-
|-  bgcolor="#FFBBBB"
| 1985-10-20 || Loss ||align=left| Ernesto Hoost ||  || Amsterdam, Netherlands || Decision || 5 || 3:00
|-
|-
| colspan=9 | Legend:

Mixed martial arts record

|-
| Loss
| align=center| 0-3-1
| Toon Stelling
| Decision (Unanimous)
| Rings Holland - Utrecht at War
| 
| align=center| 2
| align=center| 5:00
| 
| 
|-
| Loss
| align=center| 0-2-1
| Kiyoshi Tamura
| Submission (Rear Naked Choke)
| Rings Holland - The Final Challenge
| 
| align=center| 1
| align=center| 2:11
| 
| 
|-
| Draw
| align=center| 0-1-1
| Lee Hasdell
| Draw
| Rings_Holland:_Kings_of_Martial_Arts
| 
| align=center| 2
| align=center| 5:00
| Amsterdam, North Holland, Netherlands
| 
|-
| Loss
| align=center| 0-1
| Enson Inoue
| TKO (Punches)
| Shooto - Vale Tudo Junction 1
| 
| align=center| 1
| align=center| 3:20
| Tokyo, Japan
|

References

External links 
 K1 Record
 MMA Record

1960 births
Living people
Dutch male kickboxers
Cruiserweight kickboxers
Heavyweight kickboxers
Dutch male mixed martial artists
Mixed martial artists utilizing Muay Thai
Dutch Muay Thai practitioners
Kickboxing trainers
Sportspeople from Zaanstad